Hatli Jamula is a village in Kangra District of Himachal Pradesh

References

Villages in Kangra district